Humber West is a defunct provincial electoral district for the House of Assembly of Newfoundland and Labrador. In 2011, there were 8,403 eligible voters living within the district.

The district includes the western part of Corner Brook, as well as the communities of Gallants, George's Lake, Pinchgut Lake and Spruce Brook. The district has elected a member of the governing party in every election since confederation, with the exception of future premier Danny Williams' by-election win two years before he led his Progressive Conservative Party to power.

The seat has been held by three former premiers of the province. From 2001 to 2010 premier Williams held the seat, from 1971 to 1979 the seat was represented by premier, Frank Moores and from 1966 to 1971 the seat was held by Joey Smallwood.

The riding voted for the party to form government in every election since Newfoundland became a province in 1949.

The district was abolished in 2015, and was succeeded by the new district of Corner Brook.

Members of the House of Assembly
The district has elected the following Members of the House of Assembly:

Election results 

|-

|-

|-
 
|NDP
|Jordan Stringer
|align="right"|764
|align="right"|19.43%
|align="right"|
|}

}

 
|NDP
|Rosie Myers
|align="right"|112
|align="right"|3.38%
|align="right"|
|}

|-

|-

|}

|-

|-

|-
 
|NDP
|Matthew Robbins
|align="right"|207
|align="right"|3.72%
|align="right"|
|}

}
|-

|-

|-
 
|NDP
|Kris Watton
|align="right"|186
|align="right"|3.71%
|align="right"|
|}

|-

|-

|-
 
|NDP
|Paul Bourgeois
|align="right"|852
|align="right"|17.68%
|align="right"|
|}

References

External links 
Website of the Newfoundland and Labrador House of Assembly

Corner Brook
Newfoundland and Labrador provincial electoral districts